The University of Oregon has a diverse array of student-run and non-student-run media outlets.

Newspapers

Daily Emerald
The Daily Emerald, published Monday through Friday, primarily features news items and commentary pertaining to the University community, and is considered the daily paper of record. In addition to the print newspaper, the Emerald publishes its features on the internet. The Emerald has been in publication for more than 100 years. A court case involving the Emerald'''s publication of several first-hand student accounts of drug use during the 1960s became the basis for the subsequent creation of the Oregon Shield Law. The paper became independent in the 1970s after editor Paul Brainerd realized the potential conflict of interest between acting as a watchdog while simultaneously receiving direct funding and oversight from the university. Today the paper is supported by advertising revenue and is distributed free to students because of a subscription fee paid by the ASUO with incidental fees.

Magazines and quarterlies

Art DuckoArt Ducko is the University of Oregon’s official comics magazine, established in the fall of 2014 for students to publish original comics. It publishes a quarterly magazine and posts content on its website.

The EcotoneThe Ecotone is an annual publication created by the graduate students of the Environmental Studies Program at UO.

 Ethos Magazine Ethos Magazine, formerly an independent publication, is a subsidiary of Daily Emerald and the Emerald Media news division. Originally Korean Ducks magazine (after the school sports team name), which focused on Korean culture, it has since developed a multicultural character. 

FluxFlux is an annual magazine written and edited by students of the University of Oregon School of Journalism and Communication. It contains in-depth features about a wide variety of topics, many of which are based in the Pacific Northwest but have national appeal and interest.

Global TalkGlobal Talk, a student-created news publication, includes one page each for Chinese, French, Dutch, Persian, German, Italian, Japanese, Russian, Scandinavian, Slavic, Swahili, Portuguese, Spanish, and other minor languages unrepresented by major departments. Global Talk is funded by several departments at the UO and was founded in November 2005. It is the first university of Oregon multilingual publication published within the university system and within the state of Oregon. 

Oregon VoiceOregon Voice primarily chronicles popular culture in a zine format. The Voice often profiles music acts as they tour through Eugene.

The SirenThe Siren is a feminist magazine produced by the Women's Center.

Student Insurgent
The Student Insurgent is a journal of radical politics published by a collective of students and community members.  The paper's coverage shifts periodically, but has covered anti-capitalist, radical environmentalist, and anti-war topics. The Insurgent has expressed solidarity with such groups as the Animal Liberation Front and the Earth First! organization. It has also rallied for the release of Mumia Abu-Jamal and Jeff Luers, a local eco-anarchist whose 22-year arson sentence was later overturned on the grounds that it was excessive, as well as other imprisoned radical-left voices, often claiming that they are wrongly held political prisoners.Student Insurgent  printed "The Jesus Issue", featuring commentary on Christianity and cartoons of Jesus, including "Jesus with erection", in response to the Jyllands-Posten Muhammad cartoons controversy. Bill O'Reilly called for the firing of university president David B. Frohnmayer and invited members of the Insurgent and the Commentator onto the O'Reilly Factor, but only Commentator staff accepted.

Radio
Under the Associated Students, the University of Oregon operates two radio stations on campus.

 KWAX 
KWAX is a non-commercial classical music radio station in Eugene, Oregon, broadcasting to the Eugene-Springfield, Oregon area. The station is a listener supported service of the University of Oregon.

 KWVA 
KWVA is a college radio station broadcasting from the EMU building on the University of Oregon campus in Eugene, Oregon, United States. Licensed to the University of Oregon, it serves the Eugene/Springfield metropolitan area and has a live online stream.

Television & Film

 DuckTV 
DuckTV is the University of Oregon's only student-run television network. Weekly episodes feature news, sports, comedy, and dramatic shows.

 University Film Organization 
The University Film Organization (UFO) is a student-run collective of filmmakers that produces short films as well as hosting educational events and workshops. UFO also hosts an annual film festival on campus.

Non-student-run media

 Oregon Quarterly Oregon Quarterly is a University magazine that presents "the diversity of ideas and people associated with the University, Oregon, and the Northwest."

 University of Oregon Press 
The University of Oregon Press publishes books, which, since June 1, 2005, have been distributed by the Oregon State University Press.

 Center for Media and Educational Technologies 
The Center for Media and Educational Technologies (CMET) streams video productions to promote the physical and virtual learning environments at the University of Oregon.

 AroundtheO 
AroundtheO provides news and information pertaining to university affairs. 

 UOMatters 
UOMatters is a watchdog blog covering events affecting the University of Oregon.

Defunct Media

The Comic PressThe Comic Press – originally known as The Weekly Enema – was a semi-monthly newspaper written and edited by students at the University of Oregon from 2008 – 2009. Its mission was to "provoke intelligent thought and discussion through humor." It republished a number of webcomics and contained topical and humorous features about a wide variety of campus topics.

Daily JadeDaily Jade was an independent satirical news website launched on November 18, 2013 and defunct as of February 9, 2015. Operating at the URL "dailyjade.com", it published articles lampooning current events surrounding the University of Oregon, the city of Eugene, and university life in general. 

 Northwest Review 
The tri-annual Northwest Review journal of literature was published for over 50 years up to 2011. In 2020, it resumed publication with a new editor in chief S. Tremaine Nelson.

Oregon CommentatorOregon Commentator was a journal of opinion and humor founded on September 27, 1983, making it the second oldest publication on campus after Daily Emerald. Modeled in equal parts after such publications as Harvard Lampoon and Reason Magazine, the Commentator'' was primarily known for libertarian and conservative stances and served as a contrarian outlet for students resistant to the political atmosphere on campus. In addition to a print magazine, it published website content.

References

University of Oregon
Mass media in Eugene, Oregon
University and college mass media in Oregon